The Common Law is a book that was written by Oliver Wendell Holmes Jr. in 1881, 21 years before Holmes became an Associate Justice of the Supreme Court of the United States.

The book is about common law in the United States, including torts, property, contracts, and crime.  It is written as a series of lectures. It has gone out of copyright and is available in full on the web at Project Gutenberg.

One of the most famous aphorisms to be drawn from this book occurs on the first page: "The life of the law has not been logic: it has been experience." Holmes's pronouncement is a subtle qualification of a dictum by the famous seventeenth-century English jurist Sir Edward Coke: "Reason is the life of the law."

References

External links
The Common Law by Oliver Wendell Holmes, Jr., from the U. of Toronto Typographical Society.

 The Common Law by Oliver Wendell Holmes Jr.
 

1881 non-fiction books
Law books
Law of the United States
Oliver Wendell Holmes Jr.